The women's 20 kilometres walk event at the 2002 Asian Athletics Championships was held in Colombo, Sri Lanka on 11 August. It was the first time that the road 20 kilometres was staged at the Asian Championships replacing the track 10,000 metres.

Results

References

2002 Asian Athletics Championships
Racewalking at the Asian Athletics Championships
2002 in women's athletics